State I Am In or The State I Am In may refer to:

 The State I Am In (film), 2000 German film
 "State I'm In", 2014 song by Needtobreathe
 State I'm In (album), 2019 album by Aaron Lewis
 The State I'm In (Louie Louie album), 1990
 The State I'm In (Leigh Nash album), 2015
 "The State I Am In", song from the 1996 album Tigermilk by Belle & Sebastian
 "The State I'm In", song from the 1995 eponymous album by Ednaswap